Alyssum dagestanicum, the Dagestanian alyssum, is a species in the family Brassicaceae that is native to Russia and the Caucasus Mountains. It occurs in rocky xerophyte communities in the middle montane zone. It is threatened by grazing and cropland development.

References

dagestanicum